The 1999 ASB Classic was a women's tennis tournament played on outdoor hard courts at the ASB Tennis Centre in Auckland in New Zealand that was part of Tier IVb of the 1999 WTA Tour. The tournament was held from 4 January until 9 January 1999. Third-seeded Julie Halard-Decugis won the singles title and earned $16,000 first-prize money.

Finals

Singles

 Julie Halard-Decugis defeated  Dominique Van Roost, 6–4, 6–1
 It was Halard-Decugis' 1st title of the year and the 14th of her career.

Doubles

 Silvia Farina /  Barbara Schett defeated  Seda Noorlander /  Marlene Weingärtner, 6–2, 7–6(7–2)

Prize money 

Total prize money for the tournament was $112,500.

Entrants

Seeds

Other entrants
The following players received wildcards into the singles main draw:
  Leanne Baker
  Rewa Hudson

The following players received wildcards into the doubles main draw:
  Leanne Baker /  Rewa Hudson

The following players received entry from the singles qualifying draw:

  Émilie Loit
  Irina Selyutina
  Miho Saeki
  Meilen Tu

The following players received entry from the doubles qualifying draw:

  Anca Barna /  Karin Miller

See also
 1999 Heineken Open – men's tournament

External links
 Tournament edition details
 Tournament draws

ASB Classic
WTA Auckland Open
ASB
ASB
1999 in New Zealand tennis